Sarah Posner is an American journalist and author. She is the author of two books about the American Christian right and has written for The American Prospect, The Guardian, The Nation, Salon, AlterNet, The Atlantic, The Washington Spectator, The Daily Beast, and The Washington Post. She was formerly a contributing writer for Religion Dispatches, writing on the intersection of religion and politics.

Her second book, Unholy, was favorably reviewed by the National Catholic Reporter and by writers at Wesleyan University and Washington University in St. Louis.

Books
God's Profits: Faith, Fraud, and the Republican Crusade for Values Voters (2008)  OCLC 166872616
Unholy: Why White Evangelicals Worship at the Altar of Donald Trump (2021)

References

External links
 

Living people
American women journalists
21st-century American journalists
21st-century American women writers
Year of birth missing (living people)